People's Park is an urban public park in Luohu District of central Shenzhen in Guangdong province, China. Established in 1983, it is one of the first parks in Shenzhen.

The hill in the park offers a panoramic view of the park and the city.

People's Park is best known for its rose garden on the central island. It is one of the largest rose gardens in China, with more than 50,000 flowers of over 300 cultivars. It is a popular tourist destination during the flowering season from early December to late February. The park hosts an annual rose exhibition. In 2014, the 16th exhibition was held in early February during the Chinese New Year holiday.

See also
List of parks in Shenzhen

References

Urban public parks
Luohu District
1983 establishments in China
Parks in Shenzhen